Daniel Israel Arnon (November 14, 1910 – December 20, 1994) was a Polish-born American plant physiologist and National Medal of Science recipient whose research led to greater insights into the operation of photosynthesis and nutrition in plants. 

In the first part of his professional career, the so-called "Plant Nutrition Years (1936-1950)", Arnon and collaborators  discovered the essentiality of molybdenum for the growth of all plants and of vanadium for the growth of green algae. In the second one, the so-called "Photosynthesis Period (1951-1978)", plant micronutrient work led him to photosynthesis. 

In 1954, Arnon,  Mary Belle Allen and F. Robert Whatley  discovered photophosphorylation in vitro. In 1967 he was nominated jointly (but unsuccessfully) with Allen and Whatley for a Nobel Prize.

Early life and education
Arnon was born on November 14, 1910, in Warsaw, Poland, to a Jewish family. Summers spent on the family's farm helped foster Arnon's interest in agriculture. His father had lost the family's food wholesale business after World War I. Reading about scientific agriculture in the works of Jack London, led him to save his money and apply to the University of California in the United States of America.

Career
Arnon enrolled as a student in the University of California from Poland, and would spend his entire professional career at the university, until his retirement in 1978. He earned his Bachelor's degree in 1932 and his Ph.D. in plant physiology in 1936 at UC Berkeley under the supervision of Dennis R. Hoagland.

Some of Arnon's earliest research focused on growing plants in nutrient-enriched water rather than soil. Together with his supervisor, he further developed the Hoagland solution which was published in modified form as Hoagland's solution (1, 2) in 1938. After Hoagland's death, it was further revised by Arnon in 1950. Arnon became an Assistant Professor at the University of California in 1941. 

During World War II, Arnon served as a major in the Army Air Corps of the United States Army and was sent to the Pacific Theater of Operations. From 1943 to 1946 he used his prior experience with plant nutrition on Ponape Island, where there was no arable land available. He was able to grow food to feed the troops stationed there using gravel and nutrient-enriched water.

After returning from military service in 1946, Arnon became an Associate Professor of cell physiology at the University of California, Berkeley.  He investigated plant nutrition  and the contributions of  micronutrients  such as molybdenum for the growth of all plants and of vanadium for the growth of green algae. 

In the 1950s, Arnon performed research with Mary Belle Allen and F. Robert Whatley on chloroplasts and their role in photosynthesis, identifying a process which they named "photosynthetic phosphorylation". The group demonstrated how energy from sunlight is used to form adenosine triphosphate, the energy transport messenger within living cells, by adding a third phosphorus group to adenosine diphosphate. In 1954, they reproduced the process in a laboratory, making them the first to successfully demonstrate the chemical function of photosynthesis, producing sugar and starch from inputs of carbon dioxide and water in vitro.

Arnon served as  president of the American Society of Plant Physiologists from 1952 to 1953. Arnon served as the editor of the Annual Review of Plant Physiology (now the Annual Review of Plant Biology) for 1956.

Awards
In 1961, Arnon was elected to the National Academy of Sciences, 
in 1962 to the American Academy of Arts and Sciences, 
and in 1974 to the Leopoldina.

In 1973, he was awarded the National Medal of Science for "his fundamental research into the mechanism of green plant utilization of light to produce chemical energy and oxygen and for contributions to our understanding of plant nutrition." In 1940, together with Dennis Hoagland, he received the AAAS Newcomb Cleveland Prize for the work "Availability of Nutrients with Special Reference to Physiological Aspects".

The Arnon Lecture has been held annually at UC Berkeley since 2000 in early March in honour of the late Professor Daniel I. Arnon. Speakers have made significant contributions to photosynthesis or a related field and are selected by the Arnon Lecture Committee.

Family
A resident of Kensington, California, Arnon died at age 84 on December 20, 1994, in Berkeley, California, of complications resulting from cardiac arrest. He had three daughters and two sons. His wife, the former Lucile Soulé, died in 1986.

References

External links
National Academy of Sciences Biographical Memoir

1910 births
1994 deaths
National Medal of Science laureates
People from Kensington, California
Researchers of photosynthesis
UC Berkeley College of Natural Resources alumni
University of California, Berkeley College of Letters and Science faculty
Fellows of the American Academy of Arts and Sciences
Plant physiologists
20th-century American botanists
Jewish American scientists
Polish emigrants to the United States
United States Army personnel of World War II
Annual Reviews (publisher) editors
20th-century American Jews
Members of the Royal Swedish Academy of Sciences